Glendale Community College (GCC) is a public community college in Glendale, Arizona. GCC opened in 1965. Programs include associate degrees, certificate programs, industry-specific training, and university transfer. GCC is a part of the Maricopa County Community College District, one of the largest community college districts in the United States. The main campus is a  site located at 59th and Olive Avenue in Glendale.

GCC offers classes in various sites throughout the area.  GCC North in Phoenix opened in fall 2000 with 839 students from the northern part of Maricopa County. Financial backing donated by New York Architect Ron Elsensohn allowed for a major expansion of the north campus which unveiled in the fall of 2008.  GCC also offers the first two years of general education requirements at the North Valley campus of Northern Arizona University also in Phoenix and select classes at other sites such as Valley Vista High School in Surprise.

History 
Created in 1962 with one college, the MCCCD currently consists of ten separately accredited colleges. MCCCD is one of the largest community college districts in the United States. On April 12, 1965, GCC was established by the Governing Board as the second MCCCD college, and charged with serving the higher educational needs of the West Valley. In August 1967, the North Central Association of Colleges and Secondary Schools first accredited GCC as an individual college. Accreditation continues today through The Higher Learning Commission / North Central Association and includes both the GCC Main campus and the GCC North site.

Campus 
The GCC Main Campus is located at N 59th Ave and E Olive Ave in Glendale. Ground was broken on the campus on April 27, 1965. The architectural drawings for the campus were drawn up by Varney, Sexton, Sydnor Associates of Phoenix. The dedication ceremony was held October 16, 1966. After the campus opened new buildings continued to be constructed throughout the end of the 1960s. The Performing Arts Center opened in 1977. This was followed by the High Tech Center in 1987. In the early 2000s GCC began planning for construction of the North Campus. Ground was broken on the North Campus on May 7, 2007. RNL Design drew up the plans for many of the North Campus buildings. The new campus was completed in time for the Fall 2008 Semester.

Academics 
Glendale Community College has 111 degree and certificate programs.

Athletics 
GCC is home of multiple national, regional, and conference championship teams, All-American athletes and Hall of Fame coaches.  GCC has produced seven National Junior College Athletic Association (NJCAA) national championship teams:  1967 cross country, 1968 baseball, 1988 football, 1994 women's softball, 1996 women's basketball, 2000 football, 2005 football, 2014 volleyball.

Hall of Fame Athletes:
 Herb Boetto: First GCC Baseball Coach (1967)
 Paul LoDuca: GCC Baseball (1991) MLB Los Angeles Dodgers (2001)
 Pete Pisciotta: GCC Assistant Football Coach (1967) GCC Athletic Director (1975) GCC Head Football Coach (1979-1980)
 Phillippi Sparks: GCC Football 1988 National Championship Team (NJCAA) and NFL New York Giants (1992)
 Paul LoDuca: GCC Baseball (1991), MLB Los Angeles Dodgers (2001)
 Haley Christiansen: NJCAA Volleyball National Champion (2014)
 Isaiah Lopez: NJCAA DII (2015 Men's Basketball)
 Dave Grant: Baseball coach for 35 years
 1967 GCC Cross Country Team: NJCAA National Champions
 Ralph Neighbors: Track coach for 32 years
 Bob Phillips: Golf All-American, PGA Tour, 6 time Player of the Year, Southwest PGA Hall of Fame
 Joe Kersting: NJCAA 50 Winningest Coaches list for his 16-season record of 114-44-2
 1998 GCC Volleyball team: overall 42–2 record; an undefeated tournament championship at the San Diego Mesa Invitational Tournament; an undefeated conference season and ACCAC Conference Championship; an undefeated NJCAA Region 1 Tournament and Championship; a third-place finish at the NJCAA DI National Tournament; three NJCAA All Americans, a Conference MVP and several NJCAA All Tournament recipients. 
 Jeff Huson: MLB baseball player
 Scott Giddings: first NJCAA individual cross country champion, Arizona Conference individual cross country champion, All American twice, won the Arizona Conference team cross country championship twice, NJCAA team cross country championships, and was awarded GCC Sophomore Athlete of the Year 
 Ron Davis: NBA player

Notable alumni 
 Jake Angeli - Conspiracy theorist
 Jan Brewer, Governor of Arizona, 2009–2015
 James Ellisor, professional basketball player
 Vince Furnier, better known today as Alice Cooper
 Ron Kershaw, award-winning television news director
 Damon Mays Professional Football Player
 Joe Riggs, professional mixed martial artist, former WEC Middleweight Champion; formerly fighting for (Bellator), Strikeforce, and the Ultimate Fighting Championship
 Ted Sarandos Chief Content Officer at Netflix
 Randy Soderman Professional Soccer Player
 Rick Soderman Professional Soccer Player
 Philippi Sparks, Professional football player for the Giants and Cowboys. Father of Jordin Sparks, another notable Phoenix native.
 Richard Young, Former professional wrestler signed to WWE under the name Ricky Ortiz. Played football and earned a scholarship to play for the University of Tulsa.

References

External links 
 Official website
 

Maricopa County Community College District
Education in Glendale, Arizona
Educational institutions established in 1965
Community colleges in Arizona
Buildings and structures in Glendale, Arizona
Universities and colleges in Maricopa County, Arizona
1965 establishments in Arizona
NJCAA athletics